Altan Xire (sometimes rendered as Altanshiree, Atengxilian or Aletengxire;) is a town in and the county seat of Ejin Horo Banner, Inner Mongolia. Although administratively the chief town of a rural county, Altan Xire is highly urbanized with a skyscraper-filled central business district worthy of a large metropolis.

History
Starting in the early 2000s, a coal boom in the region provided the local government with ample tax revenue, propelling forward lavish development projects. The government of Ejin Horo Banner utilized its windfall to rebuild its main township of Altan Xire. The most lavish of these developments was the construction of 100 high rises for housing for civil servants. In commercial development, an entire skyline was added with the construction of the Cathay Pacific Plaza complex of office towers in 2014.

Geography
The town sits on the south bank of the Wulan Mulun River, a tributary of the Yellow River. On the north bank of the same river is Kangbashi District, known worldwide as a "ghost city" due to the large ceremonial mall area replete with huge monuments and civic buildings but not much human activity. As an adjacent urban area with much of area's housing stock, Altan Xire can be considered an extension of Kangbashi that has organically grown into a bustling city while Kangbashi still lacks liveliness.

Economy

References

Populated places in Inner Mongolia